Taavi Rissanen (7 October 1864, Kuopion maalaiskunta – 29 June 1934) was a Finnish schoolteacher and politician. He served as a Member of the Parliament of Finland from 1907 to 1908, representing the Social Democratic Party of Finland (SDP).

References

1864 births
1934 deaths
People from Kuopio
People from Kuopio Province (Grand Duchy of Finland)
Social Democratic Party of Finland politicians
Members of the Parliament of Finland (1907–08)